The Great Father  is a 2017 Indian Malayalam-language crime thriller film directed by Haneef Adeni and jointly produced by Prithviraj Sukumaran, Arya, Santhosh Sivan, and Shaji Nadesan under the banner of August Cinema. It stars Mammootty and Arya with Sneha, Anikha, Malavika Mohanan, Santhosh Keezhattoor, Balaji Sharma and Kalabhavan Shajon in the supporting roles. The original release date of 25 December 2016 was postponed to 30 March 2017. A dubbed version in Hindi, titled Dashing Jigarwala, was also released.

Plot
Samuel, a cop, investigates the crimes of serial child abuse, where he receives a phone call from a child abuser who calls himself "Joker". Samuel tracks his location, arrives at his place, and is killed by the Joker. The cases are picked up by Andrews Eappan from the Crime Investigation Department (CBCID). 

Meanwhile, David Nainan, a well known architect and father of a 10-year-old girl named Sarah, returns home from his office, where he finds Sarah lying unconscious after being brutally assaulted. Shattered, David takes her to the hospital where his wife, Dr. Michelle David, works. After recovering, Sarah reveals that it was Joker who attacked her. An enraged David and Michelle decide to find and kill him to protect other girls. David starts his own investigation,  independent of the police, causing Eapen to become suspicious of him. 

Eapen discovers that David's daughter was one of the Joker's victims, and aggressively questions her at home while he is away. David warns Eapan for upsetting his daughter. Both of them start receiving calls from the Joker and compete that who will find and get to the Joker first. The Joker attacks Eapan and David, who later manages to overpower and kill him. After this, Eapan asks Nainan about the Joker's identity, Nainan tells him that it was James, who was his office worker. Eapan admits to having wanted to kill Joker too.

Cast

Production
On 19 August 2016, actor Mammootty shared the first-look poster of the film on his Facebook profile. The film was produced by Prithviraj Sukumaran, Arya, Santosh Sivan, and Shaji Nadesan under the banner of August Cinema. South Indian actress Sneha plays the female lead. Although it was originally thought Sara Arjun would be acting as Sara, the daughter, Anikha was eventually cast in that role. Prithviraj Sukumaran was originally thought to do the role of a police officer but was later replaced by Arya due to physique issues. Later Malavika Mohanan replaced Mamta Mohandas for the role of woman inspector. Eventually Santhosh Keezhattoor opted to play the antagonist, the Joker.

On 4 September 2016, principal photography began in Wagamon, Kochi, with other shooting locations including Thrissur. Producer-actor Arya also plays a leading police role in the film. The actor himself released a teaser on 10 February.

Music
The songs were composed by Gopi Sunder.

Original soundtrack
The original soundtrack of the movie was composed, programmed, and arranged by Sushin Shyam.

Reception

Critical response
Deepa Soman of The Times of India wrote "The Great Father is worth your money for its daddy-daughter moments and a timely plot rating the film 3 out of 5 stars. If only every wronged woman had a hero for a father… you might wish as the end credits roll…," and praised Mammootty, saying: "Mammootty is suave and the thriller heavily banks on his evergreen good looks." The reviewer from Sify said the film comes heavily packed with enough masala for the masses. Mammootty succeeds in raising the mercury levels with his million-dollar looks and his hardcore fans would be delighted for sure."

The Indian Express Muhammed Hashique described this family thriller by a debut director as "watchable" fare "but don’t get your expectations high!"

Box office
The film was a commercial success. The film grossed $960,748 from UAE box office in two weeks. The Film collected ₹4.31crore on the first day of its release and ₹20.54 crore within 4 days which was an all-time record. The Final gross collection of the movie is about ₹50 crore and had a 100 days run at the theatre.

Release
The film was released in 202 screens in Kerala.

Home video
The film was released on Blu-ray on 7 July 2017.

References

External links
 

2010s Malayalam-language films
Films scored by Sushin Shyam
Indian crime thriller films
Films about child abuse
2017 crime thriller films
Films shot in Thrissur